Jean-Paul Nanga-Ntsah (born 23 May 1955) is a Cameroonian boxer. He competed at the 1980 Summer Olympics and the 1984 Summer Olympics. At the 1980 Summer Olympics, he lost to Georgică Donici of Romania.

References

1955 births
Living people
Cameroonian male boxers
Olympic boxers of Cameroon
Boxers at the 1980 Summer Olympics
Boxers at the 1984 Summer Olympics
Place of birth missing (living people)
Light-heavyweight boxers
20th-century Cameroonian people